The Bayamón River is a river of Puerto Rico beginning at an elevation of approximately 1,476 ft in barrio Beatriz in Cidra, Puerto Rico. It is slightly over 30 miles long and travels through several municipalities: Cidra, Aguas Buenas, Guaynabo, Toa Baja, Bayamón, and Cataño, then empties into San Juan Bay.

See also
Marqués de la Serna Bridge: NRHP listing in Bayamón, Puerto Rico
List of rivers of Puerto Rico

References

External links
 USGS Hydrologic Unit Map – Caribbean Region (1974)
 
 

Rivers of Puerto Rico